Douglas Street is a road in Victoria, British Columbia. It is named after Sir James Douglas, the second Governor of the Colony of Vancouver Island.

The intersection of Douglas Street and Dallas Road is the western end of the Trans Canada Highway,  known as Mile 0. There is a small monument at the corner to recognize this fact along with a statue of Terry Fox. North from the water Douglas passes the Beacon Lodge, then forms the western border of Beacon Hill Park before passing behind the Empress Hotel and the Royal British Columbia Museum. Douglas Street forms the main north-south route through downtown Victoria. The annual Victoria Day Parade also marches down this street, starting at Mayfair Centre, and ending at the British Columbia Legislature.

Before the construction of the Patricia Bay Highway in the late 1950s, Douglas Street extended a further  northward, ending at the current interchange of the Pat Bay Highway and Quadra Street. Two disconnected segments of this former extension, which were not overbuilt by the new artery, retain the name Douglas Street.

Trivia
Douglas Street is the most expensive property in the 1982 edition of the game Canadian Monopoly.

External links
BC Highways - Highway 1
Map archive at ViHistory website, with a 1953 Victoria and Vicinity Street Map showing the original route of Douglas Street.

Roads in Victoria, British Columbia
Urban segments of the Trans-Canada Highway